R&B Divas: Los Angeles (also known as R&B Divas: LA) is an American reality television series on TV One that premiered on July 10, 2013. The series chronicles the lives of a group of female R&B singers living in Los Angeles as they balance their music careers and personal lives. It is a spinoff to R&B Divas: Atlanta.

Three seasons of R&B Divas: Los Angeles aired, in 2013, 2014, and 2015 respectively. The cast changed between seasons, although Lil Mo, Chanté Moore and Michel'le remained on the show throughout its run.

The series' second season premiered on July 17, 2014, with Leela James and Chrisette Michelle joining the cast after the departures of Kelly Price and Dawn Robinson (En Vogue) . The series' third season premiered on February 11, 2015 with Stacy Francis and Christina "Brave" Williams joining the cast after the departure of City High's Claudette Ortiz.

A two-episode reunion special for the first season was filmed on August 6, 2013, with Wendy Williams as the host. Part 1 of the R&B Divas: Los Angeles reunion acquired a 0.83 rating among P25-54 and a 0.95 rating among households. It drew a total of 834,000 viewers on its original airing night. The episode is tied with The Rickey Smiley Show as TV One's highest-rated telecast among adults 25–54. In 2016, series cast member Michel'le confirmed on The Wendy Williams Show, that the show was cancelled.

Cast

Overview

Episodes

Season 1 (2013)

Season 2 (2014)

Season 3 (2015)

References

External links
 

2010s American reality television series
2013 American television series debuts
2015 American television series endings
English-language television shows
Television shows set in Los Angeles
African-American reality television series
Rhythm and blues
TV One (American TV channel) original programming